1927 Suvanto, provisional designation , is a stony Eunomian asteroid from the central region of the asteroid belt, approximately 12 kilometers in diameter. It was discovered on 18 March 1936, by Finnish astronomer Rafael Suvanto at the Turku Observatory in Southwest Finland. The asteroid was posthumously named in honor of the discoverer.

Orbit and classification 

Suvanto is a member of the Eunomia family, the most prominent family in the intermediate main-belt, which mostly consists of stony S-type asteroids. It orbits the Sun at a distance of 2.3–3.0 AU once every 4 years and 4 months (1,577 days). Its orbit has an eccentricity of 0.15 and an inclination of 13° with respect to the ecliptic.

Physical characteristics 

It will pass  from 2 Pallas on 24 May 2074, which will allow a refinement to the known mass of Pallas.

Photometric observations of Suvanto collected during 2004–2005 show a rotation period of  hours with a brightness variation of  magnitude.

Naming 

This minor planet was named in memory of Rafael Suvanto (credited discoverer), assistant of Yrjö Väisälä. Suvanto died during the last days of the Finnish Winter War of in the Battle of Summa (also see naming of asteroid 1928 Summa). The approved naming citation was published by the Minor Planet Center on 1 August 1980.

References

External links 
 Asteroid Lightcurve Database (LCDB), query form (info )
 Dictionary of Minor Planet Names, Google books
 Asteroids and comets rotation curves, CdR – Observatoire de Genève, Raoul Behrend
 Discovery Circumstances: Numbered Minor Planets (1)-(5000) – Minor Planet Center
 
 

001927
Suvanto
19360318